Rachel Giana Fox (born July 23, 1996) is an American actress best known for playing Kayla Huntington Scavo in the ABC television series Desperate Housewives.<ref>{{cite web|url = https://www.hollywoodreporter.com/live-feed/private-practice-desperate-housewives-rachel-fox-295819|last= Goldberg|first= Lesley|title= Private Practice' Admits 'Desperate Housewives' Alum for Guest Spot (Exclusive)
|date = February 28, 2012|accessdate = November 4, 2018|website= The Hollywood Reporter}}</ref>

Career
Acting career
Fox has also appeared on Alias, That's So Raven, iCarly, Hannah Montana, as well as voicing characters in the video games Ant Bully and Thrillville.

She appeared on ABC's Desperate Housewives from September 2006 until May 2008 as a series regular, portraying Lynette's sociopathic step-daughter Kayla Huntington.

In July 2009, Fox filmed the movie Spork, which was released in 2010 which would be her first lead movie role. She also starred in Jim Sheridan's Dream House, portraying Chloe Patterson, daughter of Ann and Jack Patterson (played by Naomi Watts and Marton Csokas, respectively).

She recurred as Holly Reback in the ABC Family sitcom Melissa & Joey.

Finance career
Fox on Stocks, launched in 2012 and said to be Fox's stock-trading blog, describes her as "a very successful stock trader in her free time," and says that it "provides education for those wishing to learn more about investing."

In 2016, after publications stated that she was purportedly employed as a trader by Jacob Wohl, Fox has denied any connection with Wohl.

Filmography

Film

Television

Awards

In 2014, Fox was named one of "The 25 Most Influential Teens of 2014" by Time'' magazine.

References

External links

Living people
American child actresses
American television actresses
21st-century American actresses
1996 births